Esco or ESCO may refer to:

Places
 Esco, Kentucky, an unincorporated community in the US
 Escó, a village in Spain
 Escos, a commune in France

Organizations
 Energy service company or energy savings company (ESCO or ESCo) 
 ESCO Corporation, a manufacturer of engineered metal parts and components
 Esco (Singaporean company) that develops, manufactures, and sells products and services for laboratories
 Estonian Shipping Company, a Soviet Union- (and later Estonia-) based shipping company
 Esco Trading, an arcade game company founded by Hayao Nakayama in 1967 and purchased by Sega in 1979

Other uses
 Esco (name)
 ESCO - European Skills, Competences, Qualifications and Occupations, a multilingual classification of identifies and categorises skills, competences, qualifications and occupations relevant for the EU labour market and education
 eSCO, a Bluetooth protocol for transmitting voice data
 ESCO1, or establishment of sister chromatid cohesion N-acetyltransferase 1, a protein that in humans is encoded by the ESCO1 gene
 ESCO2, an enzyme that in humans is encoded by the ESCO2 gene

See also
 Escondido, California, a city in California, US